Nether Alderley is a civil parish in Cheshire East, England. It contains 56 buildings that are recorded in the National Heritage List for England as designated listed buildings.  Of these, one is listed at Grade I, the highest grade, four are listed at Grade II*, the middle grade, and the others are at Grade II.  The parish contains the village of Nether Alderley.  The largest house in the parish was the Old Hall which was damaged by fire in 1779.  This was replaced on a different site by Park House in Alderley Park.  This was in turn damaged by fire in 1931, and was demolished in 1933.  Much of the park has since been used by a major pharmaceutical company.

The listed buildings in the parish include St Mary's Church and associated structures, buildings associated with the Old Hall and with Park House, houses, farmhouses, farm buildings, ancient crosses, a former water mill, and a milepost.

Key

Buildings

See also

Listed buildings in Alderley Edge
Listed buildings in Over Alderley
Listed buildings in Henbury
Listed buildings in Siddington
Listed buildings in Chelford
Listed buildings in Marthall
Listed buildings in Little Warford
Listed buildings in Great Warford
Listed buildings in Chorley

References
Citations

Sources

 

Listed buildings in the Borough of Cheshire East
Lists of listed buildings in Cheshire